Maktab Anbar (Anbar Office) is a house in the center of Old Damascus, Syria. The house was built as a private residence by a local Jewish notable Mr. Anbar in the mid 19th century and was later confiscated by the Ottoman government after Mr. Anbar's bankruptcy.

The house is built around three courtyards, first the formal reception courtyard, behind this the attractive female courtyard, and finally the spartan servants' courtyard. Due to the cost of building, the owner turned the building into the Damascus Civil Preparatory School, which was a prestigious, expensive, tuition-based school for the children of the land-owning families of Damascus. According to Philip Khoury, many Syrian nationalist leaders who worked and were co-opted by the French from 1928 and independence in 1946, were graduates of Maktab Anbar. The house was restored by the Ministry of Culture in 1976. It now holds a library exhibition hall, museum and craft workshops.

Gallery

References

Houses completed in the 19th century
Old Damascene houses
Jewish Syrian history
Museums in Syria
Buildings and structures inside the walled city of Damascus
Jews and Judaism in Damascus